This is a list of Members of the Malaysian Parliament who have served for at least 30 years. The time of service is not always continuous and separate terms are aggregated. This list includes MPs who served in the past and who continue to serve in the present.

A total of 25 individuals have served in excess of 30 years in Parliament as of 2023. Thus far the only female MP to have served longer than 30 years are Rafidah Aziz and Rohani Abdul Karim.

Members of Parliament who have served for at least 30 years

Timeline

References

Senior legislators
Parliament of Malaysia

Malaysian Parliament